The 2016–17 season was 26th consecutive season in the top Ukrainian football league for FC Dnipro. Dnipro competed in Premier League and in the Ukrainian Cup. Dnipro would have qualified for the Europa League group stage as the third-placed team of the 2015–16 Ukrainian Premier League, but were excluded from participating in the 2016–17 European competitions by the UEFA Club Financial Control Body. The club was excluded from participating in the next UEFA club competition for which it would otherwise qualify in the next three seasons (2016/17, 2017/18 and 2018/19) for violating the Financial Fair Play regulations. Dnipro also was restricted from signing new players other than free agents by FFU for debts to Juande Ramos' staff. 

On 26 October 2016, Dinpro was deducted six points for the same reason. In April 2017, Dnipro was deducted of a 3 points by FFU again. Tough financial situation and numerous sanctions from FFU and UEFA affected the results of the team and Dnipro relegated to Ukrainian First League for the first time in club history one matchday ahead of season finish. On 9 June 2017, after the end of the tournament, Dnipro was deducted of 9 more points, making it 24 points total. On the decision of FIFA, FFU enforced relegation of FC Dnipro straight to the Ukrainian Second League, skipping the Ukrainian First League. The club received its Second League attestation on 21 June 2017, making it Dnipro's first appearance in this division. 

At the same time SC Dnipro-1 was formed in June 2017 as an alternative to FC Dnipro. Some of the players and manager of FC Dnipro Dmytro Mykhaylenko moved to new club. SC Dnipro-1 is registered to participate in Ukrainian Second League as well as FC Dnipro.

Players

Squad information

Transfers

In

Out

Pre-season and friendlies

Competitions

Overall

Last updated:

Premier League

League table

Results summary

Results by round

Matches

Notes:
 Match was not finished due to the fans behavior after fire landed near the referee.

Ukrainian Cup

Statistics

Appearances and goals

|-
! colspan=14 style=background:#dcdcdc; text-align:center| Goalkeepers

|-
! colspan=14 style=background:#dcdcdc; text-align:center| Defenders

|-
! colspan=14 style=background:#dcdcdc; text-align:center| Midfielders 

|-
! colspan=14 style=background:#dcdcdc; text-align:center| Forwards

|-
! colspan=14 style=background:#dcdcdc; text-align:center| Players transferred out during the season

Last updated: 31 May 2017

Goalscorers

Clean sheets

Disciplinary record

References

External links 
Official website

Dnipro
FC Dnipro seasons